Eric Johnson Jones (born February 7, 1966) is an American-Spanish former professional basketball player who had a brief career in the National Basketball Association (NBA) for the Utah Jazz during the 1989-90 season.

Personal life
Born in Brooklyn, New York, Eric is brother of Vinnie Johnson.

External links
ACB.com profile
NBA stats @ basketballreference.com

1966 births
Living people
American men's basketball players
Basketball players from New York City
Baylor Bears men's basketball players
Besançon BCD players
Birmingham Bandits players
CB Girona players
Chorale Roanne Basket players
Gijón Baloncesto players
Liga ACB players
Nebraska Cornhuskers men's basketball players
Point guards
Rapid City Thrillers players
Sportspeople from Brooklyn
Undrafted National Basketball Association players
Utah Jazz players
Valencia Basket players
Yakima Sun Kings players